Ammonifex thiophilus  is an extremely thermophilic, anaerobic, and facultatively chemolithoautotrophic bacterium from the genus of Ammonifex which has been isolated from a hot spring in Uzon Caldera in Russia.

References

 

Thermoanaerobacterales
Bacteria described in 2008
Thermophiles
Anaerobes